McDonald Emiantor, best known by his stage name Traidmarc, is a Nigerian-Australian rapper, singer, songwriter, television producer, and business executive. He is the founder of Annex Media.

Traidmarc has also worked as executive producer of Industry Leaders TV show.

Life and career 
Traidmarc was born as McDonald Emiantor in Benin City, Edo State, Nigeria. His mother, who is a teacher by profession, raised him alone along with his seven siblings.

In 1999, Traidmarc's family relocated to London, United Kingdom. He grew up and spent his early life in Blackheath, London, where he learnt his art.

In 2000, he faced a difficult time when his car crashed and was subsequently hospitalized for significant injuries. In fact, he was pronounced as a dead person when his heart beat stopped for a brief period. This was a life-changing moment in Traidmarc's life and in his view he was reborn at that time. He soon recovered from the injuries occurred due to car crash, but the difficult time continued. At one point, he became broke when his bank account was overdrawn by twenty-dollars.

In 2007, Traidmarc founded Annex Media in the United Kingdom.

In 2009, Traidmarc emigrated to Australia. Once he settled in Australia, he resumed his education and was studying to obtain a degree in media which he completed in 2014.

In 2011, his fame started when he released his first single, "Come Dance With Me", which became a major hit within a day. His popularity further increased when he released his single "Got My Eyes On You" in 2013. As a musician, he is influenced by Tupac Amaru Shakur.

In October 2020, he released a song named "End SARS" in support of End SARS protests.

In December 2020, Traidmarc's studio album, The Epilog, was released, containing twenty-four tracks, which is based on his entire life.

In March 2022, his new album, SUCCESS (The Best Revenge), was released.

Discography

Albums
The Walls Have Ears (2013)
The Epilog (November 2020)
SUCCESS (The Best Revenge) (March 2022)

Single Releases
"Come Dance with Me" (2011)
"Got My Eyes On You" (2013)
"Soulmate" (2019)
"U Got Me" (2019)
"Black Jeff" (2020)
"Big Fish" (2020)
"Get Rich and Do F**k All" (2020)
"Got My Eyes on U" (2020)
"Father Hear Me Calling" (2020)
"Cold World" (2020)

Filmography
 Industry Leaders

References

External links
Official website

21st-century Nigerian male singers